Sprengelia sprengelioides is a species of flowering plant of the family Ericaceae, and is endemic to near-coastal areas of eastern Australia. It is an erect shrub with egg-shaped leaves, and white flowers arranged singly in leaf axils.

Description

Taxonomy
This species was first formally described in was first formally described in 1810 by Robert Brown who gave it the name Ponceletia sprengelioides in his Prodromus Florae Novae Hollandiae et Insulae Van Diemen. In 1917, George Claridge Druce changed the name to Sprengelia sprengelioides in the supplement to The Botanical Exchange Club and Society of the British Isles Report for 1916. The specific epithet (sprengelioides) means "Sprengelia-like". (This species was originally in the genus Ponceletia.)

Habitat and distribution
Sprengelia sprengelioides grows swampy heath, sometimes with Banksia robur or species of Xyris. It occurs in near-coastal areas of south-eastern Queensland, and south to the Sydney region of New South Wales.

References

Epacridoideae
sprengelioides
Ericales of Australia
Flora of New South Wales
Flora of Queensland
Plants described in 1810
Taxa named by Robert Brown (botanist, born 1773)